Aloysius Patrick Martinich (born June 28, 1946), usually cited as A. P. Martinich, is an American analytic philosopher. He is the Roy Allison Vaughan Centennial Professor Emeritus in Philosophy at University of Texas at Austin. His area of interest is the nature and practice of interpretation; history of modern philosophy; the philosophy of language ; the history of political thinking and Thomas Hobbes.

Biography
Aloysius P. Martinich (June 28, 1946). He has specialized in the philosophy of language and the philosophy of Thomas Hobbes. He is the author of The Two Gods of Leviathan (1992), Hobbes: A Biography (1999), Hobbes's Political Philosophy"(2021).

Publications

Books
 Thomas Hobbes, Computatio sive Logica: Part One of De Corpore, translation and commentary, New York: Abaris Books, 1981.
 The Philosophy of Language (Critical Concepts in Philosophy), New York: Oxford University Press, 1985 (sixth edition edited with David Sosa, 2012).
 Philosophical Writing: An Introduction, Englewood Cliffs, N.J.: Prentice-Hall, 1989; fourth edition Wiley-Blackwell Publishers, 2015.
 The Two Gods of Leviathan: Thomas Hobbes on Religion and Politics, Cambridge: Cambridge University Press, 1992.
 Thomas Hobbes Perspectives on British History, London: Macmillan, 1997.
 Hobbes: A Biography, New York: Cambridge University Press, 1999.
 A Companion to Analytic Philosophy, edited with David Sosa, Oxford: Blackwell, 2001.
 Leviathan, Peterborough, Ont.: Broadview Press, 2002; revised edition with Brian Battiste, 2011.
 Hobbes (The Routledge Philosophers), New York: Routledge, 2005.
 Early Modern Philosophy: Essential Readings with Commentary, Malden: Blackwell Readings in the History of Philosophy, 2007.
 Much Ado About Nonexistence: Fiction and Reference'' (with Avrum Stroll), Lanham, MD: Rowman & Littlefield, 2007.

Notes

External links
 University of Texas at Austin, Faculty Profile Retrieved 23 July 2014.
 

1946 births
20th-century American philosophers
21st-century American philosophers
Analytic philosophers
American historians of philosophy
Living people
Philosophers of language
Philosophers of religion
Hobbes scholars
University of Texas at Austin faculty
Philosophers from Texas